Leptasterias pusilla is a small, six-rayed sea star.

Description 
"A dainty little six-rayed seastar with a total arm spread usually under 2 cm."

Distribution 
"The genus Leptasterias originates in the Arctic," and within the United States, this species can be found in the middle intertidal zone of rocky shores of central California, including San Mateo, Santa Cruz, and Monterey counties.  Leptasterias pusilla is "...generally believed to be the most abundant species in the subgenus [Hexasterias]
along the North American Pacific coast from central California to southern Alaska."

Behavior 
Leptasterias pusilla may be quite numerous in the middle intertidal zone of rocky shores, typically moving around on the top of rocks at night after hiding under them during the day.

Diet 
Poikilotherms primarily feed on small gastropods, with only minimal metabolic rate fluctuations in response to changes in ambient temperature.

Reproduction 
The Leptasterias pusilla "...breeding habits are famous."  The mother keeps the eggs and larvae in brood clusters around her mouth area until the larvae reach adult form.  "Ovigerous females may be found in January and February, with the minute offspring seen in tide pools during February and March."

See also 
 Linckia laevigata

Further reading 
 Langstroth, Lovell and Libby (2000). A Living Bay: The Underwater World of Monterey Bay. University of California Press. .
 McEdward, Larry and Benjamin G. Miner. "Larval and life-cycle patterns in echinoderms." Can. J. Zool. 2001;79(7):1125–1170.
 Worley, et al. "Seasonal patterns of ganietogenesis in a North Atlantic brooding asteroid, Leptasterias tenera." Biol. Bull. August 1977;153:237-253.

Footnotes

External links 
 Hinton, Sam. "Little Six-rayed Starfish - Leptasterias pusilla." Scripps Institution of Oceanography Archives. 1969.

Leptasterias
Animals described in 1930